Steven John Baumgartner (born March 26, 1951) is a former professional American football player who played defensive end for seven seasons for the New Orleans Saints and the Houston Oilers.

1951 births
Living people
Players of American football from Chicago
American football defensive ends
Benet Academy alumni
Purdue Boilermakers football players
New Orleans Saints players
Houston Oilers players